Maggie Mary Gee  (born 2 November 1948) is an English novelist. In 2012, she became a professor of creative writing at Bath Spa University.

Gee was one of six women among the 20 writers on the Granta Best of Young British Novelists list in 1983, which she recalls as "a very good time for fiction." She was the first female chair of the Royal Society of Literature (RSL), 2004–08.

Life
Gee was born in Poole, Dorset. As a child, she lived in the Midlands before moving to Sussex.
She was educated at state schools, won a scholarship to Somerville College, Oxford and did an MA in English literature and an MLitt on Surrealism in England. After university she worked in publishing for two years and then became a research assistant at Wolverhampton Polytechnic where she completed a Ph.D. in The Self-Conscious Novel from Sterne to Vonnegut. She was one of the original Granta 20 Best of Young British Novelists.

She is a Fellow of the Royal Society of Literature (FRSL). Her teaching specialty is 20th- and 21st-century fiction.

Gee lived in London with her husband, the writer and broadcaster Nicholas Rankin (author of Dead Man's Chest: Travels after Robert Louis Stevenson, Telegram from Guernica: The Extraordinary Life of George Steer, War Correspondent and Churchill's Wizards), and their daughter. Gee now lives in Ramsgate.

Work
Gee has published 14 novels; a collection of short stories, and a memoir. Her seventh novel, The White Family, was shortlisted for the 2003 Orange Prize and the International Dublin Literary Award. The first book-length study of her work, Mine Özyurt Kılıç's Maggie Gee: Writing the Condition-of-England Novel, was published in 2013.

Gee writes in a broadly modernist tradition, in that her books have a strong overall sense of pattern and meaning, but her writing style is characterized by political and social awareness. She turns a satirical eye on contemporary society but is affectionate towards her characters and has an unironic sense of the beauty of the natural world. Her human beings are biological as well as social creatures partly because of the influence of science and in particular evolutionary biology on her thinking. Where Are the Snows (first published in 1991), The Ice People (1998) and The Flood (2004) have all dealt with the near or distant future. She writes through male characters as often as she does through female characters.

The individual human concerns that her stories address include the difficulties of resolving the conflict between total unselfishness, which often leads to secret unhappiness and resentment against the beneficiaries; and selfishness, which in turn can lead to the unhappiness of others, particularly of children. This is a typical quandary of late 20th- and early 21st-century women, but it is also a concern for privileged, wealthy, long-lived western human beings as a whole, and widens into global concerns about wealth, poverty, and climate change. Her books also explore how humans as a species relate to non-human animals and to the natural world as a whole. Two of her books, The White Family (2002) and My Cleaner (2005), have racism as a central theme, dealt with as a tragedy in The White Family but as a comedy in My Cleaner. In 2009 she published My Driver, a second novel with many of the same characters as My Cleaner, but this time set in Uganda during a time of tension with neighboring DR Congo.

Gee is a Vice-President of the Royal Society of Literature and Professor of Creative Writing at Bath Spa University. She has also served on the Society of Authors' management committee and the government's Public Lending Right committee.

In the 2012 New Year Honours, Gee was appointed Officer of the Order of the British Empire (OBE) for services to literature. In 2016 she was elected a non-executive director of the Authors' Licensing and Collecting Society.

Bibliography

Dying, In Other Words (Harvester, 1981). 
Anthology of Writing Against War: For Life on Earth (editor) (University of East Anglia, 1982)
The Burning Book (London: Faber and Faber, 1983). New edition 1985, 
Light Years (London: Faber and Faber, 1985, re-issued by Flamingo, 1994, and by Telegram, 2005). 
Grace (London: Heinemann, 1988, Telegram, 2009) - Heinemann. 
Where Are the Snows? (London: Heinemann, 1991, re-issued by Telegram, 2005). 
Lost Children (London: Flamingo, 1994). 
The Burning Book (London: Flamingo, 1994). 
How May I Speak in My Own Voice? Language and the Forbidden (Birkbeck College: The William Matthews Lecture, 1996). 
The Ice People (London: Richard Cohen Books, 1998, revised edn, Telegram, 2008). 
The White Family (London: Telegram, 2002); 20th anniversary edition by Telegram, 2022. 
Diaspora City: The London New Writing Anthology (contributor) (London: Arcadia Books, 2003). 
The Flood (London: Telegram, 2004). 
My Cleaner (London: Telegram, 2005). 
The Blue (short stories) (London: Telegram, 2006). 
NW 15: The Anthology of New Writing, co-edited with Bernardine Evaristo (Granta/British Council, 2007).  
My Driver (Telegram, 2009). 

Virginia Woolf in Manhattan (London: Telegram, 2014). 
Blood (London: Fentum Press, 2019). 
Virginia Woolf in Manhattan Expanded US edition (London and New York: Fentum Press, 2019). 
The Red Children (London: Telegram, 2022).

References

External links
 
 
 Audio slideshow interview about The White Family on The Interview Online
Video interview about The White Family on Meet the Author
Video interview about The Blue on Meet the Author
 

1948 births
Living people
20th-century English novelists
20th-century English women writers
21st-century British novelists
21st-century English women writers
Academics of Bath Spa University
Academics of Sheffield Hallam University
Academics of the University of Wolverhampton
Alumni of Somerville College, Oxford
Alumni of the University of Wolverhampton
English women novelists
Fellows of the Royal Society of Literature
Officers of the Order of the British Empire
People from Poole
People from Ramsgate
Writers from London
Writers of Gothic fiction